Astrotischeria marginata is a moth of the family Tischeriidae. It was described by Annette Frances Braun in 1972. It is found in North America.

References

Moths described in 1972
Tischeriidae